The Indian Creek Local School District is a public school district based in Wintersville, Ohio, United States.

The district serves the villages of Wintersville, Bloomingdale, and Mingo Junction, the far western portion of Steubenville as well as unincorporated areas in central Jefferson County.

Schools
Grades 9-12
Indian Creek High School 
Grades 5-8
Indian Creek Middle School
Preschool-Grade 4
Hills Elementary School
Wintersville Elementary School

See also
List of school districts in Ohio

External links
Indian Creek Local School District – Official site.

Education in Jefferson County, Ohio
School districts in Ohio